This is a list of events in Scottish television from 1965.

Events

Unknown - Final broadcast of Free Radio Scotland on BBC television after closedown.
Unknown - ATV's senior producer Francis Essex is appointed Scottish Television's programming controller.
Unknown - The chairman of the Independent Television Authority Charles Hill pays a visit to STV's Glasgow studios. He observes an edition of the popular daytime entertainment show One O'clock Gang. He is so appalled by it, that he personally axes the programme with the words "My God, how long have you been getting away with this?".

Television series
Scotsport (1957–2008)
The White Heather Club (1958–1968)
Dr. Finlay's Casebook (1962–1971)
The Adventures of Francie and Josie (1962–1970)

Births

27 January - Alan Cumming, actor
22 February - John Leslie, television presenter
24 July - Julie Graham, actress
Unknown - Caroline Paterson, actress

See also
1965 in Scotland

References

 
Television in Scotland by year
1960s in Scottish television